Back Bay is an unincorporated settlement in New Brunswick, Canada on the shore of a bay of the same name in the Bay of Fundy.  Back Bay is a local descriptive being on the opposite side of a peninsula from Letete.  It is the centre of a large aquaculture operation and is also home to the Back Bay Elementary School.

History

In 1866 Back Bay was a farming and fishing community of about 30 families. The in 1871 was 200 people, growing to 300 by 1898 with a post office (established in 1872), two stores, and two churches.
Back Bay was home to a Connors brothers sardine factory for many years until its closure in the late 1990's

Aquaculture
A process called Integrated multi-trophic aquaculture in the Bay includes Atlantic cod, saccharina latissima (sugar kelp), alaria esculenta (winged kelp), blue mussels, and Atlantic salmon, produced in a collaborative project by the University of New Brunswick and Fisheries and Oceans Canada, and Cooke Aquaculture.
There is a large aquaculture presence in Back Bay with the main business being Cookes Aquaculture and Mowi. There is also a lobster processing plant located in Back Bay which is owned by Bayshore lobster. There is also a large commercial fishing industry with the main fisheries being Lobster, Scallop, fish dragging, and rockweeding.

References

Communities in Charlotte County, New Brunswick